Flying Dancer (foaled 1982 in New Zealand) was a Thoroughbred racehorse who competed in Hong Kong. Sired by Ballybrit, a descendant of the British champion Polymelus, he was out of the mare Pur Sang who was from the British Hyperion line.

Owned by Hong Kong businessman Lim Por-yen, Flying Dancer is best known as the winner of the inaugural running of the Hong Kong Invitation Cup in 1988 at Sha Tin Racecourse.

References
 Video at YouTube of Flying Dancers win in the 1988 Hong Kong Invitation Cup 香港邀請盃 (Chinese language)
 Flying Dancer's pedigree and partial racing stats

1982 racehorse births
Thoroughbred family 1-n
Racehorses bred in New Zealand
Racehorses trained in Hong Kong